Aleksandra Sarchadjieva (born May 20, 1983) is a Bulgarian actress and also television host of Big Brother (Bulgaria) and Dancing Stars (Bulgarian TV series). She has been the main female host of Big Brother (TV series) in Bulgaria since 2012, having hosted three VIP seasons and two all-star seasons so far.
She also starred in the Bulgarian remake of Married... with Children.

Personal life
Aleksandra is the daughter of two famous Bulgarian actors – the late Pepa Nikolova and Iossif Surchadzhiev.

Aleksandra was married to actor Ivan Laskin, with whom she has a daughter. Ivan was a guest Housemate in VIP Brother 4 in 2012.

References

1983 births
Bulgarian television personalities
Bulgarian television presenters
Living people
Actresses from Sofia
Bulgarian women television presenters